Budišići is a village in Vogošća municipality, near Sarajevo, Federation of Bosnia and Herzegovina, Bosnia and Herzegovina.

Demographics 
According to the 2013 census, its population was nil, down from 11 in 1991.

References

Populated places in Vogošća